David C. Christiani (born 1951) is an American physician, specializing in the molecular epidemiology of cancer. He is currently the Elkan Blout Professor of Environmental Health at Harvard T.H. Chan School of Public Health, where he is also the  Director of the Harvard Education and Research Center for Occupational Safety and Health. His specialty is Molecular Epidemiology of cancer.

Career 

Christiani received his BS in physics from Fairfield University in 1972, his MD  from Tufts University School of Medicine in 1976, followed by an MPH (1980) and a MS (1981) from the Harvard School of Public Health. His internship and residency were at Boston City Hospital, followed by additional work at both Boston City Hospital and the Massachusetts General Hospital. He holds specialty certification in  Internal Medicine, Preventive Medicine, and Pulmonary Diseases.

In 2012, President Barack Obama appointed Christiani to the National Cancer Advisory Board.

Awards 

Dr. Christiani is a recipient of the 2007 Robert S. Kehoe Award for Scientific Achievement from the American College of Occupational and Environmental Medicine and the 2004 Harriet Hardy Award from the New England College of Occupational and Environmental Medicine.

In 2012, the city of Shanghai awarded Christiani the Magnolia Silver Award, which recognizes the contributions of foreigners to the city's development. A total of 1,059 foreigners have received the Magnolia Silver Awards, named after Shanghai’s official flower, since they were inaugurated by the city government in 1989.

Publications 

According to Google Scholar, his five most cited papers have been cited 9833, 651, 557, 471, 385 times respectively, and he has 68 papers cited 100 times or more.

References

Living people
Harvard School of Public Health faculty
Tufts University School of Medicine alumni
Harvard School of Public Health alumni
Fairfield University alumni
American epidemiologists
1951 births